Stade de Maradi is a multi-purpose stadium in Maradi, Niger.

Use
It is used mostly for football matches and serves as the home venue for Jangorzo FC.

Capacity
The stadium holds 10,000 people.

References

Football venues in Niger
Multi-purpose stadiums in Niger
Buildings and structures in Maradi, Niger